James P. Lucas (April 7, 1927 -  April 10, 2020) was an American politician in the state of Montana. He served in the Montana House of Representatives from 1962 to 1974. In the House, Lucas served as Speaker in the 1969 and 1971 sessions, as minority leader in 1965, and majority leader in 1967. Lucas is a lawyer and alumnus of the University of Montana.

References

1927 births
2020 deaths
People from Worland, Wyoming
People from Miles City, Montana
University of Montana alumni
Montana lawyers
Members of the Montana House of Representatives
Speakers of the Montana House of Representatives